The abbreviation O&M can stand for:

Organizations
 Ogilvy and Mather, an advertising, marketing, and public relations agency
 Ohio and Mississippi Railway
 Ovens & Murray Football League
 Owens & Minor, a healthcare logistics company

Other uses
 Observations and Measurements, in information science
 Operations and maintenance
 Organization and Methods (management)
 Orientation and mobility, training for visually impaired people